Samuel Edwards (c.1668–1738) of Frodesley, Shropshire, was a British government official and Whig politician who sat in the House of Commons from 1722 to 1738

Edwards was the son of John Edwards of Pentre, Montgomeryshire. In 1697, he was a minor official at the Exchequer.  He married Rebecca Godolphin, daughter of John Godolphin of Doctors' Commons, London on 24 November 1699 and afterwards kept a close connection with the Godolphin family. Early in 1700 he was promoted to deputy teller of the Exchequer under Francis Godolphin who was a teller of the receipt. He kept his position under subsequent holders of the office. He was appointed trustee for keeper of Windsor Great Park in 1709 and held other offices including  cashier and  paymaster of Exchequer bills, and director in several lotteries. He married as his second wife, Elizabeth Jones, daughter of a Shropshire clergyman in September 1723.

Edwards acquired land in Shropshire at Frodesley and on Wenlock Edge, near Wenlock. He was elected Whig  Member of Parliament for Wenlock in a contest at the 1722,  probably on the joint interests of William Forester  and Lord Bradford. He was re-elected MP for Wenlock in  1727  and 1734. He consistently voted with the Government.

Edwards died aged 70 on 12 June 1738,. He left two sons by his first wife of whom Godolphin was Mayor of Shrewsbury in 1730.

References

1660s births
1738 deaths
Members of the Parliament of Great Britain for English constituencies
British MPs 1722–1727
British MPs 1727–1734
British MPs 1734–1741